Flying squirrel typhus is a condition characterized by a rash of early macules, and, later, maculopapules.

The flying squirrel Glaucomys volans can transmit epidemic typhus.

Apart from humans, flying squirrels are the only currently known reservoir for Rickettsia prowazekii.

See also 
 Brill–Zinsser disease
 List of cutaneous conditions

References 

Bacterium-related cutaneous conditions
Typhus